Rogues in the House is a 1976 collection of two fantasy short stories written by Robert E. Howard featuring his sword and sorcery hero Conan the Barbarian.  The book was published in 1976 by Donald M. Grant, Publisher, Inc. as volume VI of their deluxe Conan set.  The title story originally appeared in the magazine Weird Tales in 1934.

Contents
 "Rogues in the House"
 "The Frost-Giant's Daughter"

References

1976 short story collections
Fantasy short story collections
Conan the Barbarian books
Donald M. Grant, Publisher books